The women's 3000 meter at the 2016 KNSB Dutch Single Distance Championships took place in Heerenveen at the Thialf ice skating rink on Monday 28 December 2015. Although this tournament was held in 2015, it was part of the 2015–2016 speed skating season.

There were 18 participants.

Title holder was Ireen Wüst.

Overview

Result

Draw

Source:

References

Single Distance Championships
2016 Single Distance
World